Megastes is a genus of moths of the family Crambidae.

Species
Megastes australis Munroe, 1963
Megastes brunnealis Hampson, 1913
Megastes brunnettalis (Dyar, 1912)
Megastes erythrostolalis Hampson, 1918
Megastes grandalis Guenée, 1854
Megastes major Munroe, 1959
Megastes meridionalis Hampson, 1913
Megastes olivalis Schaus, 1924
Megastes praxiteles Druce, 1895
Megastes pusialis Snellen, 1875
Megastes rhexialis (Walker, 1859)
Megastes romula Dyar, 1916
Megastes rosinalis (Guenée, 1854)
Megastes septentrionis Hampson, 1913
Megastes spilosoma (C. Felder, R. Felder & Rogenhofer, 1875)
Megastes zarbinalis Schaus, 1934

References

Spilomelinae
Crambidae genera
Taxa named by Achille Guenée